Stevan "Stevo" Glogovac (Serbian Cyrillic: Стеван Стево Глоговац; born January 9, 1973) is a Bosnian Serb former football player and manager.

Playing career
Born in Bileća, SR Bosnia and Herzegovina, he made his debut for local club FK Hercegovac Bileća in 1990. Due to the beginning of the Bosnian War, he moved to Serbia where he started playing in FK Zvezdara. In 1997, he moved to the First League of FR Yugoslavia club FK Rad where his good exhibitions made him make a move to the great 1991 European and World Champions Red Star Belgrade winning two Championships, in 1999–2000 and 2000–01 seasons, and two national Cups, in 2000 and 2002. In 2002, he went to Russia and played in Anzhi Makhachkala but, in January 2003, he was back to Serbia, this time to play FK Zemun.  After two seasons there, he moved, in January 2006, to FK Bežanija. In summer 2007 he signed with another Belgrade based club FK Voždovac where he played his last season before retirement.

Coaching career
He started coaching professionally Serbian League Belgrade club FK Palilulac Beograd in 2009, by the beginning of 2010 he has left club, due to many problems, both in squad and management.

Personal life
Stevo's older brother Dragan was also a professional footballer.

References

External links
 Profile at Srbijafudbal
 Profile and stats until 2003 at Dekisa.Tripod

1973 births
Living people
People from Bileća
Serbs of Bosnia and Herzegovina
Association football fullbacks
Bosnia and Herzegovina footballers
FK Zvezdara players
FK Rad players
Red Star Belgrade footballers
FC Anzhi Makhachkala players
FK Zemun players
FK Bežanija players
FK Voždovac players
First League of Serbia and Montenegro players
Serbian SuperLiga players
Russian Premier League players
Bosnia and Herzegovina expatriate footballers
Expatriate footballers in Serbia and Montenegro
Bosnia and Herzegovina expatriate sportspeople in Serbia and Montenegro
Expatriate footballers in Russia
Bosnia and Herzegovina expatriate sportspeople in Russia
Expatriate footballers in Serbia
Bosnia and Herzegovina expatriate sportspeople in Serbia